Mordva (masculine) or mordovka (feminine) are collective terms for a Erzya or Moksha man or woman, respectively, equal to zhyd and zhydovka in several Slavic languages. In some of those languages, they are considered pejorative.

The term zhyd and mordva equivalence 
The Russian terms mordva(mordovka) and zhyd(zhydovka) equality and usage are is attested in Heikki Paasonen's Mordwinisches Wörterbuch:  Humiliating models in children’s folklore examples:

Russian 
In modern Russian, it has been an anti-Semitic slur, similar to the word zhyd, since the mid-19th century. During establishing "Erzya and Moksha Autonomous District" it was renamed to Mordvin District because Joseph Stalin who attended the meeting didn't like the name. The term Mordva became legal for both Erzya and Moksha on July 16, 1928 and never been changed.

Belarusian language 
Under the influence of Russian, the terms have also become pejorative in modern Belarusian (mordovka / mordva).

Erzya and Moksha languages 
On the First Erzya and Moksha Peoples' Congress in 1989 the first point of the Congress Declaration was renaming Mordovia to Moksha and Erzya Autonomous Republic and banning the term Mordva.

Is Mordva a slur? 

Ethnic Erzya Professor Nikolay Mokshin commented on the term in 1990:
The negative connotation of the term with  mentioned by Prof. Mokshin can be found in Russian prover cited by Vladimir Dal in his Explanatory Dictionary of the Living Great Russian Language   . Since the term origin is now obscure and few people are aware of its anti-Semitic background it is still used together with archaic epithet  (old meaning "of another faith"):  as it was applied historically to both historical Mordvins and Khazars.

Other languages 
The other language speakers are hardly aware of the term origin but those who visit Mordovia or any other Moksha or Erzya populated regions in Russia soon learn that the term is pejorative and stop using it.

See also 
Zhyd
Chukhna
Fennophobia

Notes

References

Volga Finns
Moksha language
Erzya language
Antisemitic slurs
Slavic words and phrases